Charaxes virescens is a butterfly in the family Nymphalidae. It is found in Shaba in the Democratic Republic of the Congo.

Similar species
Charaxes virescens is in the Charaxes eupale species group (clade). The clade members are:

Charaxes subornatus
Charaxes eupale
Charaxes dilutus
Charaxes montis
Charaxes minor 
Charaxes schiltzei 
Charaxes schultzei 
Charaxes virescens
Bouyer et al., 2008 erected the genus Viridixes Bouyer & Vingerhoedt, 2008 to accommodate species belonging to the eupale species group.

Realm
Afrotropical realm

References

Bouyer, T., Zakharov, E., Rougerie, R. & Vingerhoedt, E. (2008): Les Charaxes du groupe eupale : description d’un nouveau genre, révision et approche génétique (Lepidoptera, Nymphalidae, Charaxinae) Entomologica Africana Hors Série 3:1-32.

External links
Images of C. virescens Royal Museum for Central Africa (Albertine Rift Project)
Charaxes Africains systematic of Eric Vingerhoedt Taxonomy
African Charaxes/Charaxes Africains Eric Vingerhoedt images of eupale group

Butterflies described in 1991
virescens
Endemic fauna of the Democratic Republic of the Congo
Butterflies of Africa